Polyceratocarpus is a genus of flowering plants in the family Annonaceae. All known species are native to continental Africa.

Species include:
 Polyceratocarpus angustifolius, Paiva
 Polyceratocarpus askhambryan-iringae
 Polyceratocarpus germainii Botique
 Polyceratocarpus gossweileri, (Exell) Paiva
 Polyceratocarpus laurifolius, Paiva
 Polyceratocarpus microtrichus, (Engl. & Diels) Ghesq. ex Pellegr.
 Polyceratocarpus parviflorus (Baker f.) Ghesq.
 Polyceratocarpus pellegrinii, Le Thomas
 Polyceratocarpus scheffleri, Engl. & Diels
 Polyceratocarpus vermoesenii Robyns & Ghesq.

References

Annonaceae
Annonaceae genera
Taxonomy articles created by Polbot